The Moroccan Initiative was a New York City Police Department surveillance program that targeted Moroccan  immigrants in New York City. The program began with help from the CIA under President George W. Bush after the 2003 Casablanca bombings and the 2004 Madrid train bombings that was linked to Moroccan terrorists.

References 

Moroccan-American history
New York City Police Department
North African American culture in New York (state)